Éva Novák (8 January 1930 – 30 June 2005), also known as Éva Novák-Gérard, was a swimmer from Hungary. She won three medals at the 1952 Summer Olympics in Helsinki, after a bronze four years earlier in London.

She was inducted into the International Swimming Hall of Fame in Fort Lauderdale, Florida in 1973, together with her sister, Ilona Novák.

See also
 List of members of the International Swimming Hall of Fame
 List of Olympic medalist families

References

External links 
 
 
 
 
 

1930 births
2005 deaths
Hungarian female freestyle swimmers
Hungarian female breaststroke swimmers
Swimmers at the 1948 Summer Olympics
Swimmers at the 1952 Summer Olympics
Olympic swimmers of Hungary
Olympic gold medalists for Hungary
Olympic silver medalists for Hungary
Olympic bronze medalists for Hungary
Swimmers from Budapest
World record setters in swimming
Olympic bronze medalists in swimming
Medalists at the 1952 Summer Olympics
Medalists at the 1948 Summer Olympics
Olympic gold medalists in swimming
Olympic silver medalists in swimming